Monacoa grimaldii, also known as the mirrorbelly, barreleye, Grimaldi's barreleye, and flatiron fish, is a species of fish in the family Opisthoproctidae. Different sources express different views on its distribution. According to Poulsen and colleagues, it is known with certainty only from the Atlantic Ocean, with records from the Pacific Ocean representing other Monacoa species. However, FishBase and Catalog of Fishes include the Pacific, and in the case of the latter, the Indian Ocean in its range. It has a body length of  SL.

References

Opisthoproctidae
Fish of the Atlantic Ocean
Taxa named by Erich Zugmayer
Fish described in 1911